The 1980 U.S. Women's Open was the 35th U.S. Women's Open, held July 10–13 at Richland Country Club in Nashville, Tennessee.

Amy Alcott won her only U.S. Women's Open, nine shots ahead of runner-up  She entered the final round with an eight-stroke lead; it was the second of her five major titles.

The field of 150 players included 49 amateurs, of which two made the 36-hole cut.

On the weekend, temperatures reached .

Past champions in the field

Made the cut

Source:

Missed the cut

Source:

Final leaderboard
Sunday, July 13, 1980

Source:

References

External links
Golf Observer final leaderboard
U.S. Women's Open Golf Championship
Richland Country Club

U.S. Women's Open
Golf in Tennessee
Sports competitions in Nashville, Tennessee
History of Nashville, Tennessee
Women's sports in Tennessee
U.S. Women's Open
U.S. Women's Open
U.S. Women's Open
U.S. Women's Open